Cadman is a surname. Notable people with the surname include:

 Alan Cadman (born 1937), Australian politician
 Alfred Cadman (1847–1905), New Zealand politician
 Bill Cadman (born 1960), American politician from Colorado
 Charles Wakefield Cadman (1881–1946), American composer
 Christine Cadman (1908), British archer
 Chuck Cadman (1948–2005), Canadian politician
 Colin Cadman (1916–1971), Scottish botanist
 David Cadman, Vancouver city councillor
 Deborah Cadman (born 1963), British politician
 Dona Cadman (born 1950), Canadian politician
 Dorothy A. Cadman ( 1908–1927), English painter
 Elijah Cadman (1843–1927), English evangelist
 F. K. Cadman (1904–1931), British socialist
 John Cadman (disambiguation), multiple people
 Radclyffe Cadman (1924–2011), South African politician
 Robert Cadman (1711–1739), British steeplejack and ropeslider
 Royce Cadman (born 1987), English rugby union player
 S. Parkes Cadman (1864–1936), American clergyman, newspaper writer
 Samuel Cadman (1877–1952), English cricketer
 Stacey Cadman (born 1979), British actress and television presenter
 William Cadman (1883–1948), English missionary

English-language surnames